Cottage Springs is minor set of springs in Calaveras County, California.
It lies at an elevation of 5827 feet (1776 m).

References

Reference bibliography

External links

Unincorporated communities in California
Unincorporated communities in Calaveras County, California